Greetings & Salutations is the first studio album by Belgian indie rock band Intergalactic Lovers.

Track listing
All songs by Intergalactic Lovers and Thomas Hahn except tracks 3, 6, 10 by Intergalactic Lovers. Additional vocal on 6 by Ian Clement.

Charts

References

2011 debut albums
Intergalactic Lovers albums